Ibn abd al-Malik al-Marrakushi or al-Murrakushi (Full name: Abu abd Allah Muhammed ibn Muhammed ibn abd al-Malik al-Marrakushi  ) (b. 5 July 1237 – September 1303) was a Moroccan Arab scholar, historian, judge and biographer. He is the author of the famous book 'Ad-Dayl wa Takmila', a nine-volume biographical encyclopaedia of notable people from Morocco and al-Andalus.

Life

Born into a notable family of prestigious Arab lineage in Marrakech, hence the nisba, al-Marrakushi. In 1300, Ibn Abd al-Malik left Marrakech following the court of the Marinid King Abu Yaqub Yusuf an-Nasr and settled in Mansourah, where the Marinids were besieging Tlemcen in an attempt to oust the Abd al-Wadid dynasty. He seems to have died there three years later in September 1303, despite reports of him being at Aghmat only three months earlier.
He had a son who settled in Málaga where he became a close friend of Ibn al-Khatib. The latter based much of his biographical book Al-Ihata on the works of Ibn abd al-Malik.

Work

  Ad-Dayl wa Takmila ('Appendix and Supplement'); Ibn abd al-Malik's biographical dictionary and life's work completed months before his death.  His intention to complete the biographical dictionaries of Ibn Bashkuwāl and Ibn al-Faraḍī resulted in this surpassing sequel. Of the nine original, approx., 700 page volumes, four volumes survive intactvols. 1, 5, 6, 8.  Two more survive in partvols. 2 and 4.  The work is rich in detail.  Some inaccurate renderings  in name pronunciation arise from the Arabic writing system. 

Al-Dhayl wa-al-takmilah : li-kitābay al-Mawṣūl wa-al-Ṣilah

References

See also

Abdelwahed al-Murrakushi

List of Arab scientists and scholars

Encyclopædia Britannica Online

1237 births
1303 deaths

13th-century biographers
13th-century Moroccan historians

Moroccan bibliographers
Moroccan biographers
14th-century Moroccan historians
13th-century Moroccan judges
Moroccan scholars
People from Marrakesh
13th-century Arabs
14th-century Arabs
14th-century Moroccan judges